= Future Network Development Conference =

The Future Network Development Conference (Chinese: 未来网络发展大会; pinyin: Wèilái Wǎngluò Fāzhǎn Dàhuì) is about future network development of the international exchange conference. It is held in Nanjing, Jiangsu Province of China.

== History ==
=== First Conference ===
The first Conference was surrounding the topic about creation, cooperation, reciprocity, future development and held the Internet Financial Security Forum by Chinese Academy of Engineering and Nanjing Municipal Government on 17–18 April 2017.

=== Second Conference ===
The second Conference topic was about creation, lead, and future, led by the Ministry of Industry and Information Technology and Jiangsu Provincial Government, held by the Chinese Academy of Engineering and Nanjing Municipal Government. The participants were experts, business, and a total of 400 from all over the world. The project of the CENI was started up at the Second Conference.

=== Third Conference ===
The third Conference topic was about internet global, win for the future, total of 400 experts, business surrounding discussion of the network challenge and follow-up development opportunity on 22–23 May 2019.

=== Fourth Conference ===
The fourth Conference discussed the future of network development, emphasized the global influence of the future network, and focused on innovative applications and cross-border integration of global high-end industries such as artificial intelligence, intelligent manufacturing, and blockchain. The conference participants were the experts and business about the future network, security network, blockchain and artificial intelligence related fields on 14–15 August 2020.

=== Fifth Conference ===
The fifth Conference discussed the Network Operation System, 6G communication, security network, Industrial Internet, held by physical and online meetings on 17–18 June 2021. The closing ceremony contracted a total investment of 15.46 billion of the 28 projects.
